The Next Logical Progression is the third solo studio album by American rapper Gift of Gab. It was released on Quannum Projects on March 27, 2012.

Critical reception
At Metacritic, which assigns a weighted average score out of 100 to reviews from mainstream critics, The Next Logical Progression received an average score of 71% based on 9 reviews, indicating "generally favorable reviews".

David Jeffries of AllMusic gave the album 4 stars out of 5, saying: "A spoonful of sugar helps the medicine go down, which is the great trick behind this persuasive album, offering a serious argument with plenty of hot buttered soul."

Track listing

References

External links
 

2012 albums
Gift of Gab (rapper) albums
Quannum Projects albums